Bandra Lamahalé is a small town on the island of Anjouan in the Comoros. According to the 1991 census the town had a population of 1,531. The current estimate for 2009 is 2,695 people

References

Populated places in Anjouan